Kisarawe is a Tanzanian district that is the larger settlement of the Pugu Hills, southwest of Dar es Salaam. In the Kisarawe district there is an 8200-hectares cultivation of Jatropha shrubs that are processed to produce biodiesel.

It is one of the districts of the Pwani (Coast) region and also one of the earliest districts of Tanzania. It is bordered by Mkuranga District to the east, Dar es Salaam region to the north east, Kibaha district to the north, Rufiji district to the South and Morogoro region to the west.
As of January, 2018 the population of Kisarawe district was 108,398 according to the Kisarawe District council website. The district is divided into seventeen (17) wards. 
Though Kisarawe has not enjoyed the economic prosperity as the neighbouring Dar es Salaam and other surrounding districts, it is strategically located with both TAZARA and Central railway lines passing through the district. It is also  a few kilometres from JK Nyerere International Airport in Dar es Salaam.
The Pugu Forest Reserve, an important nature reserve around the Dar es Salaam area is located in the district. Also Kisarawe is one of the major cultivators of cassava in Tanzania.

Footnotes

Populated places in Dar es Salaam Region
Energy in Africa